The following roads have been called the Industrial Freeway:
Industrial Freeway, unconstructed portion of, as well as an older name for, California State Route 47
Detroit Industrial Freeway, part of Interstate 94 in Michigan
New York Avenue Industrial Freeway, proposed replacement for U.S. Route 50 in the District of Columbia